(date of birth and death unknown) was a male king of Kununokuni, recorded in the Wajinden, a 3rd century figure from Wakoku (now Japan) in the 3rd century. Naitō Torajirō proposed the theory that he was Himikoso.

People 
He had a disagreement with Himiko, the queen of Yamatai, which is located north of Kununokuni, and is recorded to have started a war with her in 247 (the 8th year of the Shōgen era according to the Wei calendar system).

According to various theories, he was Kumaso's chief (or Emishi chief), but details are unknown.

Original text 

 其南有狗奴國。男子爲王、其官有狗古智卑狗。不屬女王。
 其八年、太守王頎到官。倭女王卑彌呼與狗奴國男王卑彌弓呼素不和、遺倭載斯・烏越等詣郡、說相攻擊狀。

Various theories 

 Naito Konan, who advocates the Yamatai Honshu Theory, says that the name "Himiyumi-yoso" in the original text is not "Himiyumi-yoso yori" but "Himiyumi-yoso" and assumes that the "yoso" in the name refers to "the chiefs and others of the Assault The name "Yoboso" is assumed to refer to "the chiefs and others in the land of the term "Sokoku" refers to the area of Kumaso (southern part of Kyushu), and in addition to Naito, Arai Hakuseki, Shiratori Kurakichi, Tsuda Sokichi, Inoue Mitsusada, Kida Sadakichi and others also used Gunu as the name of Kumaso, and thus consider the same person to be a Kumaso figure. In addition to Naito, Arai and Yamada hold to the Yamatai Kyushu Theory, while Motoi, Shiratori, Tsuda, Inoue, Kida, and Yoshida hold to the Yamatai Kyushu Theory. The record of the same persons is limited to two references (#original text) in the Wajinden, which are inferred by Linguistics, History, and other approaches, respectively.
 Yamada Takao identifies Keno Province as Keno Province (the area around present-day Tochigi Prefecture and Gunma Prefecture), and thus identifies the same person as a Maojin, or Emishi.
 Other scholars, such as Motoori Norinaga and Yoshida Togoh, have suggested that Gunnu-kuni was located in Iyo ProvinceKazahaya County, Kono Township (now Matsuyama City, Hojo).
 Ryūsaku Tsunoda, founder of the Columbia University Institute for the Study of Japanese Culture, translated Wei-shi-wajinden into English in 1951, using Himikuku or Pimikuku,. The latter rendering is in accordance with the theory of labial degeneration in Japanese (see Hagyo#Phonological History, section on Hagyo Tengyo). Other readings of Himikyūko include Himikyūko「Himikuko」, which some believe to be an error for Hikomiko (彦御子, male king)。
 The "" theory, introduced by the well-known researcher Yuichi Sato, is that "" is an error for "", and "彦御子", or "son of the emperor", which is synonymous with prince is a Common noun, which refers to Prince, and "Himiko" is also a common noun referring to "the emperor's daughter", synonymous with "Himiko" and Princess, would be a counterpart to "Himiko". Furthermore, the theory adopted by Sato goes beyond the meaning of the emperor's sons and daughters, and states that "Hikomiko" refers to a "male king" and "Himimiko" to a "queen".
 Some consider Hiyakyuu to be the king of Kennichibetsu (Kumaso) "Hayato", and call him Hisuteronomyi (in the Nihon shoki Hosuseri). Hoderi in hoshiromikoto means "fire burning brightly". According to Yozaburo Ishihara, Himiko has the characteristics of Himiko, and since he was a "male", the "bow" was probably added to the name. He may have been good with the bow, or he may have been a king who excelled at speed and rapid attack, as with the bow.

References

Bibliography 

 内藤湖南『卑彌呼考』
 『読史叢録』所収、弘文堂、1929年8月
 『内藤湖南全集 第七巻』所収、筑摩書房、1969年8月20日初版 ISBN 4480755071
 喜田貞吉『くぐつ名義考 古代社会組織の研究』
 『民族と歴史』第8巻第4号-5号所収、日本学術普及会、1922年10月-11月
 『先住民と差別 喜田貞吉歴史民俗学傑作選』、河出書房新社、2008年1月30日初版 ISBN 4309224776
 山田孝雄『狗奴國考』
 『世界』第83号所収、京華日報社、1910年
 『考古學雜誌』第12巻第8号-12号所収、日本考古学会、1922年4月-8月
 Ryūsaku Tsunoda, tr. 1951. Japan in the Chinese Dynastic Histories: Later Han Through Ming Dynasties. Goodrich, Carrington C., ed. South Pasadena: P. D. and Ione Perkins.

 佐藤裕一『日本古代史入門』、文芸社、2006年9月 ISBN 4286018644
 根崎勇夫『「極南界」を論ず』、文芸社、2000年9月 ISBN 4835504658
 直井裕『邪馬台国は三重県にあった』、文芸社、2002年6月 ISBN 4835538773

See also 

 Wajinden
 Kununokuni
 Kukochihiko
 Himiko

External links 

 『卑彌呼考』：旧字旧仮名 - 青空文庫
 『くぐつ名義考』：新字新仮名 - 青空文庫
 
Wajinden
Japanese monarchs
People of Yayoi-period Japan
Pages with unreviewed translations